Audray Glenn McMillian (born August 13, 1962), is a former professional American football cornerback who played in eight NFL seasons from 1985 to 1993 for the Houston Oilers and Minnesota Vikings. McMillian played football collegiately at the University of Houston and was selected by the New England Patriots in the 3rd round of the 1985 NFL Draft. He was a Pro Bowl selection in 1992 after leading the NFL, along with Buffalo's Henry Jones, with eight interceptions.

References

1962 births
Living people
American football cornerbacks
Houston Cougars football players
Houston Oilers players
Minnesota Vikings players
National Conference Pro Bowl players